The Lausberg area is a part of southern Italy that covers much of Basilicata and the northern edge of Calabria. In it are found Neapolitan dialects characterized by vowel developments that are atypical for Italo-Romance languages. It is named after the German philologist Heinrich Lausberg, who brought the area to the attention of mainstream scholarship in 1939.

Stressed vowel outcomes 
There are three main subdivisions, as can be seen on the map to the upper right.

Romanian-like 

Dubbed the Vorposten ('outpost') by Lausberg, this area encompasses the towns of Castelmezzano, Potenza, and Picerno; here the Latin vowel /i/ merged with /eː/, while /u/ merged with /uː/. The same asymmetric vowel development characterizes Balkan Romance languages such as Romanian. Unlike them, the dialects of the Vorposten proceeded to merge the outcome of Latin /e/ with the combined outcome of /i/ and /eː/.

Transitional 

The western part of Lausberg's Mittelzone ('middle area') encompasses the towns of Lauria, Maratea, Scalea, Diamante, and Verbicaro; here the majority of words show a stressed vowel development similar to that of Sicilian, although many words have Sardinian-like outcomes as well. In much of the Mittelzone, both in the west and east, Latin final /s/ and /t/ survive in certain verb endings.

Sardinian-like 

The eastern part of the Mittelzone encompasses the towns of Senise, Tursi, and Oriolo; here the tonic vowels developed approximately as in Sardinian. There is evidence, however, of an earlier distinction between Latin /eː oː/ and /e o/. In the variety spoken in Senise, for instance, the outcomes of Latin /e/ and /o/ were subject to diphthongization when stressed and followed by a syllable containing a close vowel (namely /i/ or /u/), while the outcomes of /eː/ and /oː/ were not. Cf. Latin /fokum, nepoːteːs/ > */ˈfɔku, neˈpoti/ > [ˈfwokə, nəˈpʊtə].

Selected lexical comparisons 
Below are the (non-metaphonic) stressed vowel outcomes in the three regions, each represented here by one dialect.

Here is a comparison of conjugated forms of the verb meaning 'die' (in the present indicative) in various parts of the Mittelzone. Asterisks indicate forms that cause syntactic doubling in a following word.

Notes

References

Bibliography 

 Lausberg, Heinrich. 1939. Die mundarten Südlukaniens. Halle: Niemeyer.
 Loporcaro, Michele. 2011. Phonological processes. In Maiden, Maiden & Smith, John Charles & Ledgeway, Adam (eds.), The Cambridge history of the Romance languages, vol. 1, 109–154. Cambridge University Press.
 Ledgeway, Adam. 2016. The dialects of southern Italy. In Ledgeway, Adam & Maiden, Martin (eds.), The Oxford guide to the Romance languages, 246–269. Oxford University Press.
 Trumper, John. 1997. Calabria and southern Basilicata. In Maiden, Martin & Parry, Mair (eds.), The dialects of Italy, 355–364. London: Routledge.

Neapolitan language
Italic phonologies